The Sd.Kfz. 11 (Sonderkraftfahrzeug – special motor vehicle) was a German half-track that saw widespread use in World War II. Its main role was as a prime mover for medium towed guns ranging from the 3.7 cm FlaK 43 anti-aircraft gun up to the 10.5 cm leFH 18 field howitzer. It could carry eight troops in addition to towing a gun or trailer.

The basic engineering for all the German half-tracks was developed during the Weimar era by the 's Military Automotive Department, but final design and testing was farmed out to commercial firms with the understanding that production would be shared with multiple companies. Borgward was chosen to develop the second smallest of the German half-tracks and built a series of prototypes between 1934 and 1937. However development was taken over in 1938 by Hanomag who designed the main production version, H kl 6.

The chassis formed the basis for the Sd.Kfz. 251 medium armored personnel carrier. Approximately 9,000 were produced between 1938 and 1945, making it one of the more numerous German tactical vehicles of the war. It participated in the Invasion of Poland, the Battle of France, the Balkans Campaign and fought on both the Western Front and the Eastern Front, in North Africa and in Italy. Nine were also received by the Kingdom of Romania in late 1942.

Description

The Sd.Kfz. 11 used a conventional ladder frame. It had a Hanomag U 50 transmission with four forward and one reverse gears.

Both tracks and wheels were powered as well as used for steering. The steering system was set up so that shallow turns used only the wheels, but brakes would be applied to the tracks the farther the steering wheel was turned. The drive sprockets had rollers rather than the more common teeth. The rear suspension consisted of six double roadwheels, overlapping and interleaved in the Schachtellaufwerk system, mounted on swing arms sprung by torsion bars. An idler wheel, mounted at the rear of the vehicle, was used to control track tension. The front wheels, carried on the rigid front axle, had transversely mounted leaf springs and shock absorbers, the only ones on the vehicle, to dampen impacts.

Two different upper bodies were built over the production run of the Sd.Kfz. 11. The "artillery" body had an ammunition compartment separating the driver's compartment from the crew compartment. The ammunition compartment had doors that opened on each side of the vehicle and could be configured for different sizes of ammunition. Bench seats on the sides of the vehicle, with under-seat storage, could accommodate six men. The crew entered from the rear of the vehicle. The windshield could fold forward and was also removable. A convertible canvas top was mounted above the ammunition compartment. It fastened to the windshield and to the rear of the crew compartment when erected. Side pieces could be mounted to protect the crew from the weather.

The "engineer" body had three bench seats for the crew and a convertible canvas top was mounted at the upper part of the rear body. It fastened to the windshield when erected. Side pieces could be mounted to protect the crew from the weather. There was a storage compartment at the rear of the vehicle, underneath the crew seats. Photographic evidence shows both "artillery" and "engineer" versions were used by artillery units.

Design and development
Preliminary design of all the German half-tracks of the early part of the war was done by Dipl.Ing. Ernst Kniepkamp of the Military Automotive Department (Wa Prüf 6) before the Nazis took power in 1933. His designs were then turned over to commercial firms for development and testing. Borgward was assigned to develop the  towing vehicle with the first HL. kl. 2 prototype produced in 1933. The improved HL. kl. 3 prototype followed in 1936, but differed only in details from the earlier prototype.

The first production model was the HL.kl.5 which still used the Type 3500 L engine and the Hansa-Lloyd-Goliath transmission, but was lengthened by two roadwheels per side.

Hanomag took over development of the vehicle in 1938 and designed the H kl 6 which initially used a Maybach HL 38 TUKR engine that was superseded early in the production run by a HL 42 TUKRM.

Production
Borgward and Hanomag initially built the Sd.Kfz. 11 chassis, but later Adlerwerke of Frankfurt-am-Main, Horch of Zwickau and Škoda of Mladá Boleslav were added to the production plan. On 20 December 1942 some 4209 were in service. 2133 were built in 1943 and 1308 in 1944. All told, over 9000 were built by 1945.

Variants

Sd.Kfz. 11/1
There were two vehicles created during the war and given this designation. The earlier vehicle was a version of the Sd.Kfz. 11, an ammunition carrier for the 10 cm Nebelwerfer 35 or 40 mortar. The ammunition compartment had racks to hold the shells and their propellant with side-opening doors. The later version created in 1944, the Sd.Kfz. 11/1, was an anti aircraft vehicle using the armoured front superstructure of the Sd.Kfz. 251 and mounting a 2 cm Flak 38 gun.

Sd.Kfz. 11/2

The Sd.Kfz. 11/2 was a chemical decontamination vehicle fitted with a  capacity spreader and space for eight barrels of decontamination chemicals. This left room for only three crewmen. The barrels were stowed on platforms over the tracks with foldable outer rails. In addition to this, each vehicle carries 16 decontamination canisters, each holding  of decontaminant, for use by hand on isolated areas.

Sd.Kfz. 11/3
The Sd.Kfz. 11/3 was equipped with a  tank and spray system to lay down poison gas barriers.

Sd.Kfz. 11/4
The Sd.Kfz. 11/4 was an ammunition vehicle for units using the 15 cm Nebelwerfer 41 multiple rocket launcher. Its ammunition racks could carry  mortar shells,  or  rockets. It could carry thirty-six 15 cm or ten 21 cm rockets as well as the six man crew of the launcher.

Sd.Kfz. 11/5
The Sd.Kfz. 11/5 was an ammunition vehicle for units using the Nebelwerfer multiple rocket launcher. Unlike earlier Nebelwerfer ammunition vehicles it was given a wooden upper body with two compartments. The forward cargo compartment was open-topped and lacked the racks of earlier models. The rear crew compartment had a bench seat facing the rear of the vehicle with rifle racks on each side of the seat.

Notes

Footnotes

References
 
 Chamberlain, Peter, and Hilary L. Doyle. Thomas L. Jentz (Technical Editor). Encyclopedia of German Tanks of World War Two: A Complete Illustrated Directory of German Battle Tanks, Armoured Cars, Self-propelled Guns, and Semi-tracked Vehicles, 1933–1945. London: Arms and Armour Press, 1978 (revised edition 1993). 
 Niehorster, Leo W. G. German World War II Organizational Series, Vol. 4/II: Mechanized GHQ units and Waffen-SS Formations (28th June 1942) Milton Keyes, Buckinghamshire: Military Press, 2004
 Spielberger, Walter J. Halftracked Vehicles of the German Army 1909-1945. Atlgen, PA: Schiffer, 2008

External links

 Lexikon-der-wehrmacht.de 
 Half Track SdKfz 11 from wwiivehicles.com
 on Kfz. der Wehrmacht
 American wartime intelligence report on German chemical warfare vehicles
 photo walk-around of a surviving "engineer" bodied half-track

World War II armoured fighting vehicles of Germany
World War II half-tracks
Half-tracks of Germany
Military vehicles introduced in the 1930s
SPGs. SPAs. Armored cars and trucks of 1938